Wayfarers Chapel, or "The Glass Church" is located in Rancho Palos Verdes, California. It has unique organic architecture sited on cliffs above the Pacific Ocean. It is affiliated with the Swedenborgian Church of North America and serves as a memorial to the 18th century scientist and theosopher, Emanuel Swedenborg.

History
The church was designed by Lloyd Wright (son of Frank Lloyd Wright) in the late 1940s and was built between 1949 and 1951. Wright departed from the tradition of using masonry in order to "achieve a delicate enclosure that allows the surrounding landscape to define the sacred space". Additions were built in later years, including a tower and a visitor center, the latter of which had been lost in a landslide during the 1960s.

Architecture and design
As with many of Wright's buildings, the chapel features geometric designs and incorporates the natural landscape into the design. The Wayfarers Chapel is listed in the National Register of Historic Places.

Because of its scenic location, the church is popular for weddings.

In popular culture
The church was featured in the Fox teen drama television series The O.C., as the site of weddings and funerals. It was also featured briefly on the American science fiction television series Sliders, and in an episode of The Rockford Files (season 2, episode 10, "2 Into 5.56 Won't Go"). In addition, the chapel was part of the final marriage scene in Innerspace, and two episodes in season four of 90210. The chapel was featured in one of the final scenes in the 2014 movie Endless Love, as well as being featured in the ABC television series  Revenge. Marina and the Diamond's Baby music video's wedding scene was filmed at the chapel, and The CW show,  Lucifer. Pentatonix's video for the song Amazing Grace was filmed at the chapel.

Jayne Mansfield and Mickey Hargitay were married there in 1958.

Image gallery

References

External links
WayfarersChapel.org
Spherical panorama of Wayfarers Chapel (Requires Adobe Flash)

Chapels in the United States
Churches in Los Angeles County, California
Swedenborgian churches in California
Palos Verdes Peninsula
Churches on the National Register of Historic Places in California
Buildings and structures on the National Register of Historic Places in Los Angeles County, California
Churches completed in 1951
20th-century Swedenborgian church buildings
Modernist architecture in California